is a city located in Fukui Prefecture, Japan. ,  the city had an estimated population of 92,210 in 31,509 households and a population density of 550 persons per km².

Geography
Sakai is located in far northern Fukui Prefecture, bordered by the city of Awara and Ishikawa Prefecture to the north and the Sea of Japan to the northeast, The city of Fukui borders the city to the south. The Kuzuryū River flows through the city.

Neighbouring municipalities 
Fukui Prefecture
Awara
Fukui
Katsuyama
Eiheiji
Ishikawa Prefecture
Kaga

Climate
Sakai has a Humid climate (Köppen Cfa) characterized by warm, wet summers and cold winters with heavy snowfall.  The average annual temperature in Sakai is 14.3 °C. The average annual rainfall is 2476 mm with September as the wettest month. The temperatures are highest on average in August, at around 26.9 °C, and lowest in January, at around 2.8 °C.

Demographics
Per Japanese census data, the population of Sakai has recently plateaued after a long period of growth. Sakai is the second most populous city in Fukui Prefecture. The Harue and Maruoka neighborhoods in the southern part of the city function as commuter towns for the city of Fukui.

History
Sakai is part of the ancient Echizen Province. The semi-legendary Kofun period Emperor Keitai is said to have come from the area that is now the Maruoka neighbourhood of Sakai. During the Edo period, the area was divided between the holdings of the Maruoka Domain, Fukui Domain and tenryō holdings directly under control of the Tokugawa shogunate. Following the Meiji restoration, the area was organised into part of Sakai District in Fukui Prefecture. The epicentre of the 1948 Fukui earthquake was in Maruoka. The towns of Mikuni and Maruoka were created with the establishment of the modern municipalities system on April 1, 1889. The village of Harue was raised to town status on April 3, 1942. The village of Sakai was created on March 1, 1955 by the merger of the villages of Higashi-Jūgō, Hyōgo and Ōseki. It was raised to town status on April 1, 1961. The modern city of Sakai was established on March 20, 2006, from the merger of the former town of Sakai with the towns of Harue, Maruoka and Mikuni. Sakai District was dissolved as a result of this merger.

Government
Sakai has a mayor-council form of government with a directly elected mayor and a unicameral city legislature of 26 members.

Education
Sakai has 19 public elementary schools and five middle schools operated by the city government, and three public high school operated by the Fukui Prefectural Board of Education. The prefectural also operates one special education school.

High schools
Maruoka Senior High School
Mikuni Senior High School
Sakai Senior High School

Transportation

Airport
Fukui Airport (No scheduled flight services.)

Railway
  JR West - Hokuriku Main Line
  - 
  Echizen Railway Mikuni Awara Line
  -  -  -  -  - (Awara-shi) -  -  -  -

Highway
 Hokuriku Expressway

Local attractions
Echizen-Kaga Kaigan Quasi-National Park
Tōjinbō, National Scenic Site and Natural Monument
Maruoka Castle, one of the 100 Famous Castles of Japan
Maruoka Domain Battery, National Historic Site
Rokuroseyama Kofun Cluster, National Historic Site
Technoport Fukui Stadium
Mikuni Onsen

Notable people
Shigeharu Nakano (from Maruoka) - author and Communist Party politician
Chosei Komatsu (from Mikuni) – artistic director of the National Symphony Orchestra of Costa Rica
Ai Takahashi (from Harue) – former leader of Japanese idol group Morning Musume.
Kazuhiko Masada (from Mikuni) - Japanese professional wrestler and member of Tokyo Gurentai

References

External links

 
  

 
Cities in Fukui Prefecture
Populated coastal places in Japan